Kuivarahu may refer to several geographical objects in Estonia:

Kuivarahu, small islet in Soonlepa Bay in the Hiiumaa Islets Landscape Reserve
Kuivarahu, small islet between Liialaid and Tauksi islands
Kuivarahu, elongated islet in the Väinameri Sea, south of Rukkirahu
Kuivarahud, small islets south of Vilsandi
Telve Kuivarahu, small islet near Telve island in the Vilsandi National Park

Islands of Estonia